= Conseil de Famille =

Conseil de Famille (French: family council) is a French institution for the protection of the interests of minors. By the Code Civil (art. 407–410), it is composed of seven members. The local justice of the peace (juge de paix) is the presiding officer. The other six members must be relations of the minor, chosen from the mother's and father's side of the family respectively (three on each side). The Code gives in minute detail rules for choosing these relations. Meetings of the family council are held in private, five of the members constituting a quorum. The council has power to appoint a guardian to the minor; to authorize marriage or oppose it; to audit the accounts and decide questions concerning the minors estate. The French family council is founded on the Roman law of tutelage.

== See also ==
- Juvenile court
